Fourplay is an American jazz band.

Fourplay or 4 play may also refer to:

Music
 Fourplay (Fourplay album), the self-titled debut album by the above group
 Fourplay (The Sensational Alex Harvey Band album), 1977
 Fourplay (Double Exposure album)
 Four Play (album), a 1990 jazz album by Clifford Jordan, Richard Davis, James Williams and Ronnie Burrage
 FourPlay String Quartet, an Australian rock band
 4 Play, 2005 album by Berlin
 4 Play (Cookies album), a 2004 album by Cookies
 4Play, a 2014 album by rapper Gashi
 Christopher "4Play" Myers, a former member of Pretty Ricky

Other uses
 Fourplay (2001 film), a comedy film directed by Mike Binder
 Fourplay (2018 film), an American comedy-drama film
 4 Play (film), a 2010 film directed by Frank Rajah Arase
 Fourplay (web series), a 2017 comedy web series on ALTBalaji
 Four Play, a 2010 novel by Maya Banks
 Fourplay, an online game by OMGPop

See also
 Forplay (disambiguation)
 Foreplay, sexual acts
 Fore Play, a 1975 American comedy film
 "Foreplay/Long Time", a 1976 song by Boston